Jaya Ancol Circuit is the first automotive circuit in Indonesia & was built around 1970. This was the only circuit at that time and was the pride of the Indonesian people at that time. The car racing circuit in the Ancol area, North Jakarta attracted a lot of attention at that time.

History

Previously this circuit was used as a car racing event called Indonesian Grand Prix. The Indonesian Grand Prix was an open-wheel racing car motor race, held intermittently as motorsport ambitions varied in Indonesia. Held originally at the Ancol Circuit near Jakarta in 1976 as part of the burgeoning Rothmans International Grand Prix Trophy series for Formula Pacific open wheelers, the race was discontinued after the inaugural event.

Construction & specification

At the time of the construction of this circuit, a lot of sponsors spent large sum of money that were huge for that time. Like  Astra and PT Indocement, these two companies contributed Rp. 30 million to PT Jaya Ancol Circuit, which at that time was both the manager and the one who built the circuit. And Tinton Soeprapto, a racer who has many achievements and is the father of 2 national racers namely Ananda Mikola and Moreno Soeprapto, at that time was appointed as the mascot of racers by Ali Sadikin who was then governor of DKI. This is intended to attract more foreign racers to compete at the Ancol circuit, North Jakarta.
This circuit underwent several renovations in the process of construction.

In October 1969, the Jaya Antjol Race I event was held where at that time the condition of the circuit was just an ordinary residential road with broken bends. The width of this circuit is only 7 to 10.5 meters with a track length of 3,590 meters. Then in 1970, Jaya Antjol Race II was held in October. In this event, the length of the circuit was changed to 3,950 meters and the number of corners was increased to 12 corners.

In 1971, the Ancol circuit was completely renovated at a cost of around 400 million rupiah in 1971. The funds are used for hotmix asphalting, construction of paddock, pit and tower. The Ancol circuit paddock consists of 3 rooms, each measuring 150 m x 12 m, 75 m x 12 m and 51 m x 5 m. This paddock can accommodate about 100 cars or 150 racing motorbikes including the equipment. In the pit, there is room that can accommodate 30 racing cars or 50 racing motorbikes. Enough for 2 pit crews for each racer. In addition, there is also a control tower consisting of 3 floors where the top floor is used for the score board and TV as well as where journalists and police are stationed. The first floor of this tower building is used as a race control room, doctors and flags. The second floor of the building itself is used as a time checking room and the office of the competition committee.

The layout of this circuit is more or less the same as an urban circuit with a dominant straight line combined with broken corners. It's just that the development in Jakarta in the '70s was not as fast as it is now. Just imagine a village area or housing that has not been built so that it is only empty land with weeds and a few trees given asphalt roads and used for racing. The circuit is so simple that even the racers' paddock is under a tree. In terms of specifications, this circuit after undergoing renovations in 1971 turned into an L shape like the Salzburg Circuit (Austria) and Lakeside Circuit (Australia) in its day.

The length of the track is 4,470 m with a straight line that passes through the Duta Toradja restaurant along 1,070 m. The width of the road was also increased to 9 meters and 12 meters from the previously planned minimum of 10 meters and a maximum of 18 meters after considering security aspects. No wonder then that this circuit became one of the best in Asia at that time right behind the Fuji circuit, Japan. It's no wonder then that there are many international scale events that are presented at this circuit, such as the Ancol Grand Prix, Ancol 7-hour endurance and so on. The cars that compete in this circuit are actually not kidding either. PT. Astra, for example, has developed the Toyota Starlet KP47 and Toyota Corolla KE30 with Tom's Japan specifically for this circuit specification.

Closure

The Jaya Ancol Circuit was originally managed by BPP Ancol, and was once held by Herman Sarens Soediro, while Tinton Soeprapto assumed its management in 1983. Until then Governor Soeprapto sent an order to the Chairman of the Indonesian Motorcycle Association (IMI), which at that time was held by Hutomo Mandala Putra, who was fondly called Tommy. The point is, all racer can use the Ancol circuit until there is a replacement.

The area of ​​the Ancol circuit which was originally 40 hectares has become smaller, leaving a land area of ​​about 12 hectares. Besides the residents of the adjacent elite housings being disturbed by the roar of racing engines and smoke pollution, many facilities in the arena itself were damaged. Perhaps the only thing that was still smooth at that time was the circuit itself. The Jaya Ancol Circuit was closed in 1992, replaced by the Sentul Circuit in Bogor, which is 40 km to the south from Jakarta.

The remains of the circuit is now used for access road for the Jaya Ancol theme park, while the southern loop is now occupied by highway interchange. The new Jakarta International e-Prix Circuit is located right adjacent to the former site of the north loop.

Results

Winners of the Ancol Formula Atlantic Indonesian Grand Prix :

References

North Jakarta
Sports venues in Jakarta
Motorsport venues in Indonesia
1969 establishments in Indonesia
1992 disestablishments in Indonesia